Saint Theophilus the Penitent or Theophilus of Adana (Greek: Θεόφιλος Άδανας, died  538 AD) was a cleric in the sixth century Church who is said to have made a deal with the Devil to gain an ecclesiastical position. His story is significant as it is one of the oldest popular stories of a pact with the devil and was an inspiration for the Faust legend. Eutychianus of Adana, who claimed to be an eyewitness of the events, is the first to record Theophilus's story.

Although Theophilus is considered to be an historical personage, the tale associated with him is of an apocryphal nature. His feast day is February 4.

Legend

Theophilus was the archdeacon of Adana, Cilicia, then a part of the Byzantine Empire. He was unanimously elected to be a bishop, and when out of humility he turned the position down, another man was elected in his stead. When the new bishop, based on malicious and unfounded rumors, unjustly deprived Theophilus of his position as archdeacon, Theophilus regretted his previous stance and sought out a necromancer, who helped him contact Satan. In exchange for his aid, Satan demanded that Theophilus renounce Christ and the Virgin Mary in a contract signed with his own blood. Theophilus complied, and the devil gave him the position as bishop.

Later, fearful for his soul, Theophilus repented and prayed to the Virgin for forgiveness. After forty days of fasting, the Virgin appeared to him and verbally chastised him. Theophilus begged forgiveness and Mary promised to intercede with God. He then fasted a further thirty days, after which Mary appeared to him again, and granted him absolution. However, Satan was unwilling to relinquish his hold over Theophilus, and three days later, Theophilus awoke to find the damning contract on his chest. He then took the contract to the legitimate bishop and confessed all that he had done. The bishop burned the document, and Theophilus died out of sheer joy to be free from the burden of his contract.

Importance
Theophilus's story played a role in establishing the importance of the intercession of the Virgin Mary, in addition to providing a basis for later tales involving the conjuration of devils. In the 10th century, the German canoness Hrotsvitha included the story of Theophilus in her Book of Legends.

The Virgin Mary increased in her theological importance throughout the 11th century. The story was used to illustrate the power and necessity of her intercession by Peter Damian, Bernard of Clairvaux, Anthony of Padua, Bonaventure and much later on by Alphonsus Liguori. The story of Theophilus formed the basis of a thirteenth-century miracle play by the trouvère Rutebeuf, Le Miracle de Théophile, one of the earliest pieces of French theatre extant. Over time, the tale acquired a number of variations. In some, Theophilus was motivated by jealousy. In another, the pact was sealed with a ring.

The story of Saint Theophilus is an important example in the development of the theology of witchcraft. As seen in the tale, the summoning of devils was not originally considered to be a damning sin; Theophilus's troubles come from the fact that he has sold his soul, not that he treated with the devil. This changed during the late 13th century and into the 14th century as Inquisitors such as Bernard Gui and Nicolau Aymerich sought to expand the power of the Inquisition, whose mandate was the suppression of heresy, by defining sorcery as a form of heresy. Accordingly, Theophilus would have been branded a heretic for his association with the devil.

The legend in art 
The legend of Theophilus first appears in art in the 11th century in an historiated initial, which depicts the Virgin (who is seated between two angels) with Theophilus at her feet. The earliest intact narrative cycle is at the abbey church of Sainte-Marie at Souillac, France. This sculpture depicts four scenes of the legend: the signing of the bond, the oath of loyalty to the devil, Theophilus's repentance, and the return of the bond by the Virgin.

The legend was the most popular in art in the 13th century; it occurred most frequently in illuminated manuscripts and stained glass. In both illuminated manuscripts and stained glass that depict this legend there are usually four scenes that are shown: the sealing of the bond between Theophilus and the devil, Theophilus repenting, the Virgin recovering the bond, and the Virgin returning the bond to Theophilus. This legend is the only non-biblical Marian story consistently depicted in sculpture and glass in French cathedrals during this time.

Marcel Proust briefly mentions him in Swann's Way as being an important figure of sculpture in France.

References

Sources
 John Yohalem (March, 2005), "Crossing the Line of Forbidden Knowledge" Retrieved 11 April 2005
 Paul Carus (1900) "The History of the Devil " pp. 415–417 Retrieved 11 April 2005
 Alphonsus Liguori, (1750)"Mary's Intercession Is Necessary for our Salvation " Retrieved 11 April 2005

External links
The National Library of the Netherlands has a collection of images pertaining to Saint Theophilus.

538 deaths
People from Adana
Byzantine saints
Saints from Anatolia
Witchcraft
6th-century Byzantine bishops
6th-century Christian saints
Year of birth unknown
Year of death uncertain
Marian visionaries
Deal with the Devil
Legendary Romans